The Ginocchio or Ginocchio Hotel is a historic hotel in Marshall, Texas that was originally constructed in 1896 next to the Texas and Pacific Railway station. At that time, it was on the same side of the tracks and provided disembarking passengers with ready access to a hotel and restaurant facility. During its height, the building housed several U.S. Presidents and actor John Barrymore (whose father, Maurice Barrymore, was shot at the Marshall train station in 1879, and whose granddaughter is actress Drew Barrymore), among others. The name is derived from the family that built the building and is located in the Ginocchio Historic District of the National Register of Historic Places. In 2017, the establishment reopened under new ownership as a restaurant and bar after being closed for renovations for two years.

See also

 National Register of Historic Places listings in Harrison County, Texas
 Recorded Texas Historic Landmarks in Harrison County

References

External links

 Official website
 The Portal to Texas History - The Ginocchio Hotel
 Ginocchio Hotel from the Center for Regional Heritage Research, Stephen F. Austin State University

Buildings and structures in Marshall, Texas
Buildings and structures completed in 1896
Hotels established in 1896
1896 establishments in Texas